This is a list of award winners and league leaders for the Atlanta Braves professional baseball franchise, including its years in Boston (1871–1952) and Milwaukee (1953–1965). The awards are MLB-designated and other outside groups such as national press writers and national commercial product manufacturers.

Award winners

Most Valuable Player
Note: This was re-named the Kenesaw Mountain Landis Memorial Baseball Award in 1944.

Johnny Evers (1914), Bos, 2B
Hank Aaron (1957), Mil, OF
Dale Murphy (1982, 1983), Atl, OF
Terry Pendleton (1991), Atl, 3B
Chipper Jones (1999), Atl, 3B
Freddie Freeman (2020), Atl, 1B

Cy Young Award
Tom Glavine (1991, 1998)
Greg Maddux (1993, 1994, 1995)
John Smoltz (1996)

Jackie Robinson, Rookie of the Year Award

Note: Formerly called Rookie of the Year Award by the MLB before 1987
Earl Williams C (1971)
Bob Horner 3B (1978)
David Justice OF (1990)
Rafael Furcal SS (2000)
Craig Kimbrel CP (2011)
Ronald Acuña Jr. OF (2018)
Michael Harris II OF (2022)

Manager of the Year Award
See footnote
Bobby Cox (1991, 2004, 2005)
Brian Snitker (2018)

Platinum Glove Award
Note: This award is given to the best defensive player in each league.

Andrelton Simmons SS (2013)

Gold Glove Award
Del Crandall C (1958-1960, 1962)
Hank Aaron OF (1958-1960)
Joe Torre C (1965)
Clete Boyer 3B (1969)
Félix Millán 2B (1969, 1972)
Phil Niekro SP (1978-1980, 1982, 1983)
Dale Murphy OF (1982-1986)
Terry Pendleton 3B (1992)
Greg Maddux SP (1993-2002, 2004–2008)
Marquis Grissom CF (1995, 1996)
Andruw Jones CF (1998-2007)
Mike Hampton SP (2003)
Jeff Francoeur OF (2007)
Jason Heyward OF (2012, 2014)
Andrelton Simmons SS (2013, 2014)
Ender Inciarte OF (2016-2018)
Freddie Freeman 1B (2018)
Nick Markakis OF (2018)
Max Fried SP (2020-2022)
Adam Duvall OF (2021)
Dansby Swanson SS (2022)

Wilson Overall Defensive Player of the Year Award

Michael Bourn (NL 2012)
Jason Heyward (MLB 2014)
Andrelton Simmons (MLB 2015)

Wilson Defensive Player of the Year Award

Note: In its first two years, the award was given to a player on each MLB team; one awardee was then named the Overall Defensive Player of the Year for the American League and another for the National League. Starting in 2014, the award is now given to one player at each position for all of Major League Baseball; one of the nine awardees is then named the Overall Defensive Player of the Year for all of Major League Baseball.
Team (National League)

Michael Bourn (2012)

Andrelton Simmons (2013)
Shortstop (in MLB)

Andrelton Simmons (2014, 2015)
Right fielder (in MLB)

Jason Heyward (2014, 2015)
First base (in MLB)

Freddie Freeman (2018, 2019)

Silver Slugger Award

Dale Murphy OF (1982–85)
Ron Gant OF (1991)
Tom Glavine SP (1991, 1995–96, 1998)
David Justice OF (1993)
Fred McGriff 1B (1993)
Jeff Blauser SS (1997)
John Smoltz SP(1997)
Chipper Jones 3B (1999-00)
Mike Hampton SP (2003)
Javy López C (2003)
Gary Sheffield OF (2003)
Johnny Estrada C (2004)
Andruw Jones CF (2005)
Brian McCann C (2006, 2008–11)
Justin Upton OF (2014)
Ronald Acuña Jr. OF (2019)
Ozzie Albies 2B (2019, 2021)
Freddie Freeman 1B (2019, 2021)
Marcell Ozuna OF (2020)
Max Fried SP (2021)
Austin Riley 3B (2021)

Hank Aaron Award

Andruw Jones (2005)
Freddie Freeman (2020)

Edgar Martínez Award

Marcell Ozuna (2020)

MLB Delivery Man of the Year Award

Craig Kimbrel (2013)

Trevor Hoffman National League Reliever of the Year Award
Craig Kimbrel (2014)

Comeback Player of the Year Award

Davey Johnson (1973)
Lonnie Smith (1989)
Terry Pendleton (1991)
Andrés Galarraga (2000)
Javy López (2003)
Tim Hudson (2010)
Josh Donaldson (2019)

MLB "This Year in Baseball Awards"
See: 
Note: These awards were renamed the "GIBBY Awards" in 2010 and then the "Esurance MLB Awards" in 2015.
Note: Voted by five groups as the best in all of Major League Baseball (i.e., not two awards, one for each league).

"This Year in Baseball Awards" Pitcher of the Year
See footnote
John Smoltz (2002)

"GIBBY Awards" Closer of the Year
See footnote
Craig Kimbrel (2013)

"This Year in Baseball Awards" Setup Pitcher of the Year
See footnote
Chris Hammond (2002)

"GIBBY Awards" Best Defensive Player
Andrelton Simmons (2014)

Roberto Clemente Award
Phil Niekro (1980)
Dale Murphy (1988)
John Smoltz (2005)

NL All-Stars

Aaron, Hank, OF, 1966–72, 74; 1B, 1973
Acuña Jr., Ronald, CF, 2019
Blauser, Jeff, SS, 1997
Capra, Buzz, SP, 1974
Carty, Rico, LF, 1970
Cepeda, Orlando, 1B, 1967
Foltynewicz, Mike, SP, 2018
Freeman, Freddie, 1B, 2018–19
Furcal, Rafael, SS, 2003
Galarraga, Andrés, 1B, 2000
Gant, Ron, DH, 1995
Glavine, Tom, SP, 1991–92
Inciarte, Ender, CF, 2017
Jones, Chipper, 3B, 1996, 1998, 2000–01, 2008
Justice, David, RF, 1993–94
López, Javy, C, 1997–98, 2003
Maddux, Greg, SP, 1994, 1997–98
Markakis, Nick, RF, 2018
Mathews, Eddie, 3B, 1953, 1955–62
McCann, Brian, C, 2011
McGriff, Fred, 1B, 1995–96
Millán, Félix, 2B, 1969–71
Murphy, Dale, RF, 1982–83
Prado, Martin, 2B, 2010
Pendleton, Terry, 3B, 1992
Smoltz, John, SP, 1996
Torre, Joe, C, 1966–67
Uggla, Dan, 2B, 2012
Weiss, Walt, SS, 1998

World Series MVP
Lew Burdette (1957)
Tom Glavine (1995)
Jorge Soler (2021)

National League Championship Series MVP
Steve Avery (1991)
John Smoltz (1992)
Mike Devereaux (1995)
Javy López (1996)
Eddie Pérez (1999)
Eddie Rosario (2021)

All-Star Game MVP
Note: This was re-named the Ted Williams Most Valuable Player Award in 2002.
Fred McGriff (1994)
Brian McCann (2010)

Major League Baseball All-Century Team
Hank Aaron
Rogers Hornsby
Babe Ruth
Warren Spahn
Cy Young

DHL Hometown Heroes (2006)
Note: The nominees were: Chipper Jones, Phil Niekro, John Smoltz, and Warren Spahn.
Hank Aaron — voted by MLB fans as the most outstanding player in the history of the franchise, based on on-field performance, leadership quality and character value

Major League Baseball All-Time Team
Note: Brought about by Baseball Writers' Association of America in 
Hank Aaron: Right-field runner up behind Babe Ruth
Warren Spahn: Left-handed starting pitcher runner up behind Sandy Koufax
Babe Ruth: Right-field winner 
Rogers Hornsby: Second base winner
Warren Spahn: Right-handed starting pitcher runner up behind Walter Johnson
Casey Stengel: Manager winner

Baseball's 100 Greatest Players (1998; The Sporting News)
See footnote
Hank Aaron 5th
Warren Spahn 21st
Greg Maddux 39th
Eddie Mathews 63rd

Baseball Prospectus "Internet Baseball Awards" Team of the Decade (1999)
See: Baseball Prospectus Internet Baseball Awards#Team of the Decade (1990–1999)
Rotation (top 5 starting pitchers):
Greg Maddux, Cubs–Braves
Tom Glavine, Braves
Pitcher of the Decade:
Greg Maddux, Cubs–Braves

Players Choice Awards Player of the Year
Note: Awarded by fellow major-league players as the Player of the Year in Major League Baseball (not one for each league).
Andruw Jones (2005)

Players Choice Awards NL Outstanding Player
Chipper Jones (1999)
Andruw Jones (2005)

Players Choice Awards NL Outstanding Pitcher
Greg Maddux (1994, 1995, 1998)
John Smoltz (1996)

Rolaids Relief Man of the Year Award (NL)

See footnote
John Smoltz (2002)
Craig Kimbrel (2012)

Baseball America Rookie of the Year
Note: Awarded as the Rookie of the Year in Major League Baseball (not one for each league).

2000 – Rafael Furcal
2010 – Jason Heyward

Players Choice Awards NL Outstanding Rookie
Chipper Jones (1995)
Rafael Furcal (2000)
Craig Kimbrel (2011)
Ronald Acuña Jr. (2018)

Sporting News NL Rookie of the Year Award

Note: In 1961 and from 1963 to 2003, the award was split into two categories (in each league): Rookie Pitcher of the Year and Rookie Player of the Year. Also, for the first three years (1946–1948) and in 1950, there was only one award, for all of MLB.
Carl Willey (1958)
Earl Williams (1971; Rookie Player of the Year)
Bob Horner (1978; Rookie Player of the Year)
Steve Bedrosian (1982; Rookie Pitcher of the Year)
Craig McMurtry (1983; Rookie Pitcher of the Year)
David Justice (1990; Rookie Player of the Year)
Rafael Furcal (2000; Rookie Player of the Year)
Jason Heyward (2010)
Craig Kimbrel (2011)

USA Today NL Top Rookie
Craig Kimbrel (2011)

Baseball Prospectus Internet Baseball Awards NL Rookie of the Year

Craig Kimbrel (2011)

Baseball America All-Rookie Team
See: Baseball America#Baseball America All-Rookie Team
2010 – Jason Heyward (OF) and Jonny Venters (RP)
2011 – Freddie Freeman (DH), Brandon Beachy (SP; one of five), and Craig Kimbrel (CL)
2009 – Tommy Hanson (SP)

Topps All-Star Rookie teams
1961 – Joe Torre (C)
1964 – Rico Carty (OF)
1969 – Bob Didier (C)
1971 – Earl Williams (C)
1976 – Jerry Royster (3B)
1978 – Bob Horner (3B)
1981 – Rufino Linares (OF)
1986 – Andrés Thomas (SS)
1988 – Ron Gant (2B)
1990 – David Justice (OF)
1993 – Greg McMichael (RHP)
1994 – Javy López (C), Jose Oliva (3B), Ryan Klesko (OF)
1995 – Chipper Jones (3B)
1996 – Jermaine Dye (OF)
1997 – Andruw Jones (OF)
2000 – Rafael Furcal (SS)
2002 – Damian Moss (LHP)
2004 – Adam LaRoche (1B)
2005 – Brian McCann (C), Jeff Francoeur (OF)
2009 – Tommy Hanson (RHP)
2010 – Jason Heyward (OF)
2011 – Craig Kimbrel (RP)

Players Choice Awards 'Comeback Player'
John Smoltz (2002, tie with Mike Lieberthal)
Tim Hudson (2010)
Andrés Galarraga (1993, 2000)

Players Choice Awards Marvin Miller Man of the Year

Note: Awarded by fellow major-league players as the Man of the Year in Major League Baseball (not one for each league).
John Smoltz (2002, 2003)
Chipper Jones (2012)

Lou Gehrig Memorial Award
Warren Spahn (1961)
Hank Aaron (1970)
Phil Niekro (1979)
Dale Murphy (1985)
John Smoltz (2005)

Baseball America Manager of the Year
See: Baseball America#Baseball America Manager of the Year
Bobby Cox (2004, 2010)

Team award
 – National League pennant
 – National League pennant
 – National League pennant
 – National League pennant
 – National League pennant
 – National League pennant
 – National League pennant
 – National League pennant
 – World Series championship
 – National League pennant
 – National League pennant
 – World Series championship
 – National League pennant
1991 – Warren C. Giles Trophy (National League champion)
 – Baseball America Organization of the Year
1992 – Warren C. Giles Trophy (National League champion)
1995 – Warren C. Giles Trophy (National League champion)
 – Commissioner's Trophy (World Series champion)
1996 – Warren C. Giles Trophy (National League champion)
 – Baseball America Organization of the Year
1999 – Warren C. Giles Trophy (National League champion)
 – Baseball America Organization of the Year
2021 – Warren C. Giles Trophy (National League champion)
 – Commissioner's Trophy (World Series champion)

Team records (single-game, single-season, career)

Minor-league system

Baseball America Minor League Player of the Year Award
Andruw Jones (1995, 1996)
Jason Heyward (2009)

USA Today Minor League Player of the Year Award
Mark Wohlers (1991)
Andruw Jones (1995, 1996)
Jason Heyward (2009)

Other achievements

National Baseball Hall of Fame
See: Atlanta Braves#Baseball Hall of Famers

Braves Hall of Fame

Retired numbers
See: Atlanta Braves#Retired numbers

Ford C. Frick Award (broadcasters)
See: Atlanta Braves#Ford C. Frick Award recipients (broadcasters)

BBWAA Career Excellence Award (baseball writers)

Sports Illustrated Sportsman of the Year

Dale Murphy (1987; one of eight "Athletes Who Care" selected that year instead of the usual Sportsman of the Year)

Milwaukee Braves Wall of Honor

The Milwaukee Braves Wall of Honor at American Family Field in Milwaukee, Wisconsin, is an exhibit that commemorates players who made significant contributions to the Braves during their time in the city from 1953 to 1965.

League leaders
League leader means they led the National League in the particular category. (Not the entire MLB or the American Association (before 1900).)

Wins

 John Smoltz 16 (2006)*, 24 (1996)
 Tom Glavine 21 (2000), 20 (1998),
 Denny Neagle 20 (1997)
 Russ Ortiz 21 (2003)
 Max Fried 7 (2020)*

Saves

 Craig Kimbrel 46 (2011)*, 42 (2012)
 John Smoltz 55 (2002)

E.R.A.

 Jim Turner 2.38 (1937)
 Warren Spahn 2.36 (1947), 2.10 (1953), 3.02 (1961)
 Chet Nichols Jr. 2.88 (1951)
 Lew Burdette 2.70 (1956)
 Phil Niekro 1.87 (1967)
 Buzz Capra 2.28 (1974)
 Greg Maddux 2.36 (1993), 1.56 (1994), 1.63 (1995), 2.22 (1998)

Strikeouts

 Tommy Bond 170 (1877), 182 (1878)
 Vic Willis 225 (1902)
 John Smoltz 276 (1996), 215 (1992)
 Phil Niekro 262 (1977)
 Warren Spahn 183 (1952), 164 (1951)*, 191 (1950), 151 (1949)

Home runs
 Charley Jones 9 (1879 – Boston Red Caps (Braves))
 Jim O Rourke 6 (1880 – Boston Red Caps (Braves))
 Harry Stovey 16 (1891 – Boston Beaneaters (Braves))
 Hugh Duffy 11 (1897), 18 (1894) – Boston Beaneaters (Braves)
 Jimmy Collins 15 (1898 – Boston Beaneaters (Braves))
 Herman Long 12 (1900 – Boston Beaneaters (Braves))
 Dave Brain 10 (1907 – Boston Doves (Braves))
 Fred Beck 10 (1910 – Boston Doves (Braves))
 Wally Berger 34 (1935 – Boston Braves)
 Tommy Holmes 28 (1945 – Boston Braves)
 Eddie Mathews 47 (1953), 46, (1959)
 Hank Aaron 44 (1966), 39 (1967), 44 (1963), 44 (1957)
 Dale Murphy 36 (1984), 37 (1985)
 Andruw Jones 51 (2005)
 Marcell Ozuna 18 (2020)

Batting average
 Rogers Hornsby .387 (1928 – Boston Braves)
 Rico Carty .366 (1970)
 Ralph Garr .353 (1974)
 Terry Pendleton .319 (1991)
 Chipper Jones .364 (2008)
 Hank Aaron .328 (1956), .355 (1959)

On-base percentage
 Rico Carty .454 (1970)
 Chipper Jones .470 (2008)

Hits
 Hank Aaron 200 (1956), 223 (1959)
 Red Schoendienst 200 (1957)
 Felipe Alou 218 (1966), 210 (1968)*
 Ralph Garr 214 (1974)
 Terry Pendleton 187 (1991), 199 (1992)
 Tommy Holmes 191 (1947), 224 (1945)
 Eddie Brown 201 (1926)
 Doc Miller 192, (1911)
 Ginger Beaumont 187, (1907)
 Hugh Duffy 237, (1894)
 Ezra Sutton 162, (1884)
 Deacon White 103, (1877)

Stolen bases

 Michael Bourn 61 (2011)
 Bill Bruton 25 (1955), 34 (1954), 26 (1953)
 Sam Jethroe 35 (1951), 35 (1950)

Runs

 Dale Murphy 118 (1985)
 Hank Aaron 113 (1967), 121 (1963), 118 (1957)
 Felipe Alou 122 (1966)
 Bill Bruton 112 (1960)
 Earl Torgeson 120 (1950)
 Freddie Freeman 51 (2020)

See also
Baseball awards
List of Major League Baseball awards
Warren Spahn Award

Footnotes

Atlanta Braves lists
Major League Baseball team trophies and awards